Lechaeum or Lechaion, also called Lecheae and Lecheum, was the port in ancient Corinthia on the Corinthian Gulf connected with the city of Corinth by means of the Long Walls, 12 stadia in length. The Long Walls ran nearly due north, so that the wall on the right hand was called the eastern, and the one on the left hand the western or Sicyonian. The space between them must have been considerable; since there was sufficient space for an army to be drawn up for battle. Indeed, the area was the scene of battles between Sparta and Athens in 391 BCE, leaving Spartans in command of Lechaeum, which they garrisoned with their troops (see Battle of Lechaeum).

The flat country between Corinth and Lechaeum is composed only of the sand washed up by the sea; and the port must have been originally artificial, though it was no doubt rendered both spacious and convenient by the wealthy Corinthians. Lechaeum was the chief station of the Corinthian ships of war; and during the occupation of Corinth by the Macedonians, it was one of the stations of the royal fleet. It was also the emporium of the traffic with the western parts of Greece, and with Italy and Sicily. The proximity of Lechaeum to Corinth prevented it from becoming an important town like Piraeus. The only public buildings in the place mentioned by Pausanias, who visited in the 2nd century, was a temple of Poseidon, who is hence called Lechaeus by Callimachus. The temple of the Olympian Zeus was probably situated upon the low ground between Corinth and the shore of Lechaeum.

Its site is located near the modern village of Lechaio.

References

Populated places in ancient Corinthia
Former populated places in Greece
Gulf of Corinth